Guano Island is a rocky island  long, lying  south of Chameau Island at the southeast end of the Curzon Islands, Antarctica. It was charted and named by the French Antarctic Expedition in 1951. The name derives from the considerable deposits of penguin guano there.

See also 
 List of Antarctic and sub-Antarctic islands

References

Islands of Adélie Land